An Adventure of Salvator Rosa (Italian: Un'avventura di Salvator Rosa) is a 1939 Italian historical adventure film directed by Alessandro Blasetti and starring Gino Cervi, Luisa Ferida and Rina Morelli. It is set in seventeenth century Naples, then occupied by Spain, where a famous artist celebrated for his paintings of the rich leads a double life as a secret defender of the poor and oppressed.

It was shot at the Cinecittà Studios in Rome. The film's sets were designed by the art director Virgilio Marchi.

At the time of its release, the film was greeted with unanimous critical approval. Giuseppe Isani, on Cinema, referred to it as "the best Italian film produced from 1930 onwards."

Plot 
Kingdom of Naples, 17th century. Spanish oppression becomes increasingly bloody after the popular uprising led by Masaniello. The famous painter Salvator Rosa is also a masked hero who fights against the arrogance and oppression that the nobles impose on the poorer classes: the notorious ‘Formica,’ a friend of the people, a skilled swordsman and a daring inventor of hoaxes against the viceroy of Naples and Count Lamberto, his adviser.

In Torniano, where he goes to find some rest from his labors, Rosa, there too, is confronted by the arrogance of Count Lamberto, who not only aspires to the hand of the capricious duchess, but oppresses the peasants of the contado. He thus resumes the mask of Formica and begins a dangerous game to beat the count; with cunning and incredible actions, he succeeds in saving many peasants from the gallows and also in foiling the marriage hated by the people, between the duchess of Torniano (much fascinated by Formica) and Count Lamberto; at the same time, he must succeed in retaining the trust of the suspicious peasants, but the dexterity of his plan and the skill of his fencing technique lead him to victory.

The peasant girl Lucrezia, a great supporter of Formica and in love with Salvator Rosa, discovers only at the end that behind the mask of the defender of the people’s rights is precisely the painter she loved.

Cast 
Gino Cervi as Salvator Rosa / Il Formica
Luisa Ferida as Lucrezia
Rina Morelli as Isabella di Torniano
Osvaldo Valenti as conte Lamberto D'Arco
Ugo Ceseri as Giuseppe
Umberto Sacripante as contadino 
Pietro Pastore as contadino
 as contadino
Paolo Stoppa as contadino
Carlo Duse as ufficiale di palazzo a Napoli
Enzo Biliotti as Viceroy of Naples
Jone Salinas as Amalia
Umberto Sclanizza as Il primo contadino 
 Gino Massi as Cicillo 
 Leone Papa as Il carceriere

References

Bibliography
 Pierre Sorlin. Italian National Cinema. Routledge, 2006.

External links

1939 films
Italian historical adventure films
Films directed by Alessandro Blasetti
1930s historical adventure films
Films set in the 1640s
Films set in Naples
Italian black-and-white films
Films shot at Cinecittà Studios
Cultural depictions of 17th-century painters